Mohamed Ismail Ibrahim (born 1 January 1997) is a Djiboutian runner. At the 2016 Summer Olympics he competed in the 3000 m steeplechase, but failed to reach the final.

References

External links 
 
 

Olympic athletes of Djibouti
1997 births
Athletes (track and field) at the 2016 Summer Olympics
Living people
Athletes (track and field) at the 2014 Summer Youth Olympics
World Athletics Championships athletes for Djibouti
Djiboutian male steeplechase runners
Athletes (track and field) at the 2019 African Games
African Games competitors for Djibouti